Naval Outlying Landing Field (NOLF) Santa Rosa  is a military use airport located five nautical miles (9 km) southeast of the central business district of Milton, in Santa Rosa County, Florida, United States. It is owned by the United States Navy and has four asphalt paved runways (5/23, 9/27, 14/32, 18/36) all of which are 4,500 by 150 feet (1,372 x 46 m).  The airfield is under the control of Commander, Training Air Wing FIVE at NAS Whiting Field, Florida.

This airport is assigned a three-letter location identifier of NGS by the Federal Aviation Administration, but it does not have an International Air Transport Association (IATA) airport code (the IATA assigned NGS to Nagasaki Airport in Japan).

References

External links
NOLF Santa Rosa at GlobalSecurity.org

Airports in Florida
Transportation buildings and structures in Santa Rosa County, Florida
Santa Rosa